Wake Up Ladies: Very Complicated is a 2020 Thai television series starring Niti Chaichitathorn (Pompam), Akhamsiri Suwanasuk (Jakjaan), Apissada Kreurkongka (Ice), Maneerat Kam-Uan (Ae), Tipnaree Weerawatnodom (Namtan) and Ramida Jiranorraphat (Jane) which serves as the sequel of Wake Up Ladies: The Series (2018).

Directed by Komgrit Triwimol and Rangsima Mathipornwanich, and produced by GMMTV together with Parbdee Taweesuk, it is one of the twelve television series for 2020 showcased by GMMTV during their "New & Next" event on 15 October 2019. It premiered on GMM 25 and LINE TV on 6 December 2020, airing on Sundays at 20:30 ICT and 22:30 ICT, respectively.

Cast and characters 
Below are the cast of the series:

Main 
 Niti Chaichitathorn (Pompam) as Dr. Nat
 Akhamsiri Suwanasuk (Jakjaan) as Jane
 Apissada Kreurkongka (Ice) as Chloe
 Maneerat Kam-Uan (Ae) as Aoey
 Tipnaree Weerawatnodom (Namtan) as Tata
 Ramida Jiranorraphat (Jane) as Lookmai

Supporting 
 Piyathida Mittiraroch (Pock) as Piengkwan
 Katreeya English as Miriam
 Thanat Lowkhunsombat (Lee) as Saifah
 Kanaphan Puitrakul (First) as Ryu
 Benjamin Varney as Boy
 Thongpoom Siripipat (Big) as Ton
 Luke Ishikawa Plowden as Jeff
 Phromphiriya Thongputtaruk (Papang) as Shin
 Paopetch Charoensook (Petch) as Ig
 Sivakorn Lertchuchot (Guy) as Ohm
 Chatchawit Techarukpong (Victor) as Jack
 Pusit Disthapisit (Fluke) as Mayom
 Ratthanant Janyajirawong (Ter) as Host
 Taveesak Phetpraneenukul as Dummy [Boy's friend]
 Weerayut Chansook (Arm) as Jonathan
 Jirakit Kuariyakul (Toptap) as Shinjuku
 Anuchit Sapunpohng as Im
 Sarut Vichitrananda (Big) as Ball 
 Darisa Karnpoj (Pahn) as Lin

References

External links 
 Wake Up Ladies: Very Complicated on GMM 25 website 
 Wake Up Ladies: Very Complicated on LINE TV
 GMMTV

Television series by GMMTV
Thai romantic comedy television series
2020 Thai television series debuts
GMM 25 original programming
Television series by Parbdee Taweesuk